is a Japanese footballer who is last known to have played for Woodlands Wellington FC of the Singapore S.League.

Career
While playing for Hougang United, the media propagated rumors that rivals Woodlands Wellington were going to sign Kobayashi, which they did in the 2011 mid-season transfer window.

References

1987 births
Living people
Japanese footballers
Japanese expatriate footballers
Expatriate footballers in Singapore
Albirex Niigata Singapore FC players
Hougang United FC players
Woodlands Wellington FC players
Association football central defenders